Sosnówka  is a village in Biała Podlaska County, Lublin Voivodeship, in eastern Poland. It is the seat of the gmina (administrative district) called Gmina Sosnówka.

In 2005 the village had a population of 520.

References

Villages in Biała Podlaska County